KDE Frameworks is a collection of libraries and software frameworks readily available to any Qt-based software stacks or applications on multiple operating systems. Featuring frequently needed functionality solutions like hardware integration, file format support, additional graphical control elements, plotting functions, and spell checking, the collection serves as technological foundation for KDE Plasma 5 and KDE Gear distributed under the GNU Lesser General Public License (LGPL).

Overview 

Current KDE Frameworks are based on Qt 5, which enables a more widespread use of QML, a simpler JavaScript-based declarative programming language, for the design of user interfaces. The graphics rendering engine used by QML allows for more fluid user interfaces across different devices.

Since the split of the KDE Software Compilation into KDE Frameworks 5, KDE Plasma 5 and KDE Applications, each sub-project can pick its own development pace. KDE Frameworks are released on a monthly basis and use git.

It should be possible to install KDE Frameworks alongside the KDE Platform 4 so apps can use either one.

API and ABI stability 
Platform releases are those which begin a series (version number X.0). Only these major releases are allowed to break binary compatibility with the predecessor. Releases in the minor series (X.1, X.2, ...) will guarantee binary portability (API & ABI). This means, for instance, that software that was developed for KDE 3.0 will work on all (future) KDE 3 releases; however, an application developed for KDE 2 is not guaranteed to be able to make use of the KDE 3 libraries. KDE major version numbers mainly follow the Qt release cycle, meaning that KDE SC 4 is based on Qt 4, while KDE 3 was based on Qt 3.

Supported operating systems 
The repository of each framework should contain a file named metainfo.yaml. This file documents the maintainer of the framework, the type, the supported operating system and other information. The currently supported platforms are Linux, Microsoft Windows, macOS and Android.

Software architecture

Structure 
The Frameworks have a clear dependency structure, divided into "categories" and "tiers". The "categories" refer to runtime dependencies:
 Functional elements have no runtime dependencies.
 Integration designates code that may require runtime dependencies for integration depending on what the OS or platform offers.
 Solutions have mandatory runtime dependencies.

Components 
The KDE Frameworks bundle consists of over 70 packages. These existed as a single large package, called kdelibs, in KDE SC 4. Kdelibs was split into several individual frameworks, some of which are no longer part of KDE but were integrated into Qt 5.2.

KDE Frameworks are grouped in four different tiers according to dependency on other libraries.
 Tiers of Frameworks
Tier 1  Mostly depend only on Qt, highly portable
Tier 2  Depends on Tier 1, but dependencies are still manageable.
Tier 3  Complex dependencies, including Tiers 12 etc.
Tier 4  Mostly plugins that provide additional features like platform support can be ignored.

Kirigami 
Kirigami is a QML application framework developed by Marco Martin that enables developers to write applications that run natively on Android, iOS, Windows, Plasma Mobile and any classic Linux desktop environment without code adjustments.

It is used by various applications, for example Linus Torvalds and Dirk Hohndels' scuba diving application Subsurface, the messenger client Banji, the Kaidan messenger, Vvave music player and the KDE software center Discover.

Software packages 
Linux distribution use some package management system to package the software they distribute. Debian for example distributes KGlobalAccel under the package name libkf5globalaccel, while Fedora Linux distributes it under the name kf5-kglobalaccel.

Bindings 
While being mainly written in C++, there are many bindings for other programming languages available:

 Python
 Ruby (Korundum, built on top of QtRuby)
 Perl
 C# (however, the current framework for binding to C# and other .NET languages has been deprecated, and the replacement only compiles on Windows).

These and other bindings use the following technologies:

 Smoke: for creating bindings for Ruby, C# and PHP
 SIP: for creating bindings for Python
 Kross: Embedded scripting for C++ applications, with support for Ruby, Python, JavaScript, QtScript, Falcon and Java

Many bindings weren't updated to Qt5 and KF5 or only later in the release cycle.

History 

The 5.0 release was preceded by  a technology preview, two alpha releases, and three beta releases.

The source code of KDE Frameworks has been around since KDElibs 1. The first release as KDE Frameworks was with version 5, to account for the fact that the code base was that of KDE Platform version 4 (the only major version of KDE Platform).

The transition from KDE Platform to KDE Frameworks began in August 2013, guided by top KDE technical contributors.

After the initial release of KDE Frameworks 5.0, the developers focused on adding new features to the components in KDE Frameworks 5, an example being better integration of Firefox into KDE.

The major improvement of Frameworks 5 is its modularization. In earlier KDE versions, the libraries were bundled as a single large package. In Frameworks, the libraries were split into individual smaller packages. This facilitates utilization of the libraries by other Qt-based software, since dependencies can be kept at a minimum.

While KDE 4 was based on version 4 of the Qt widget toolkit, Frameworks 5 is based on version 5.

KDE4 transformation 
During KDE SC 4, the then so called KDE Platform consisted of all libraries and services needed for KDE Plasma and the applications. Starting with Qt 5, this platform was transformed into a set of modules that is now referred to as KDE Frameworks. These modules include: Solid, Nepomuk, Phonon, etc. and are licensed either under the LGPL, BSD license, MIT License or X11 license.

Adoption 
Besides the KDE Software Compilation, there are other adopters such as the desktop environments LXQt, MoonLightDE or Hawaii.

Version 3.0 of Krita, the raster graphics editor of the Calligra Suite, which was released on May 31, 2016, depends on KDE Frameworks 5 and Qt 5.2.

With Kirigami, there is also increased usage by applications such as Amarok, Avogadro, Trojitá or Subsurface.

References

External links
KDE Frameworks in KDE's own Gitlab instance
KDE Frameworks in old Phabricator

 
Application programming interfaces
C++ libraries
Computing platforms
Free computer libraries
KDE software
Unix windowing system-related software
X-based libraries
Wayland (display server protocol)